Teewah is a small holiday town within the locality of Noosa North Shore in the Shire of Noosa, Queensland, Australia. It is 25 km north of the large city centre of Noosa Heads. It is a well known camping area and offroad vehicles can drive on the beach.

References

Shire of Noosa